Chanco is a name traditionally assigned to a Native American who is said to have warned a Jamestown colonist, Richard Pace, about an impending Powhatan attack in 1622.  This article discusses how the Native American came to be known as Chanco.

Unnamed Indian 
The Native American's warning to Richard Pace is described in the London Company's official account of the 1622 attack, but the Native American is not named.  He is described only as a converted Native American "belonging to one Perry":

The account later makes reference to other Native Americans who warned settlers of the impending attack:

None of the Native Americans who gave warnings are named.

Chauco
A Native American named Chauco is mentioned in a letter from the Council in Virginia to the Virginia Company of London, dated April 4, 1623:

"Chauco" misread as "Chancho"
In 1740, William Stith published his History of the first discovery and settlement of Virginia.  According to a description of the book on the Library of Congress website, ""William Stith compiled this detailed factual history of Virginia by culling material from the Records of the Virginia Company, a manuscript archive that Jefferson later owned and used in his own work."  The archive was subsequently acquired by the Library of Congress and is now available online 

Stith evidently read the letter in which Chauco's peace mission is mentioned, and concluded that Chauco (misread by Stith as "Chanco") was the same person as the Native American who warned Richard Pace.  This identification is explicitly made by Stith in the following passage:

Whether Stith's identification was correct or mistaken, remains undetermined.  In Pocahontas's People, Helen C. Rountree argues that Chauco and the Pace's Paines Native American have probably been wrongly conflated.

Whatever the truth, the name "Chanco" has by now been firmly established in folklore as the name of "the Native American who saved Jamestown," and seems unlikely ever to be dislodged.

Appearances In Modern Culture 
Chanco on the James (formerly Camp Chanco) is an outdoor events facility & summer camp in Surry County, Virginia owned & operated by the Episcopal Diocese of Southern Virginia.

References

People of the Powhatan Confederacy
17th-century Native Americans